Two classes of cruiser of the Royal Navy are known as the Devonshire class:

 The Devonshire class of six ships launched in 1903–1904
 A subclass of four ships of the County class, launched in 1927–1928